is a 2003 Japanese action film directed by Ryuhei Kitamura. It was Kitamura's contribution to the Duel Project, a challenge issued by producer Shinya Kawai to him and fellow director Yukihiko Tsutsumi to film a feature-length movie with only two actors, battling in one setting, in only the time frame of one week.

Plot
Two seriously wounded samurai find refuge from a storm at an isolated temple, the home of a swordsman and a mysterious young woman.

One samurai awakes to find that not only has his comrade died, but that his wounds have miraculously healed. He discovers that he has been given the power of immortality by the swordsman, a man once known as the legendary Miyamoto Musashi, who now lives an endless existence as Aragami, a "god of battle".

Production
The film was shot between May 29, 2002 and June 7, 2002.

See also
2LDK – Yukihiki Tsutsumi's Duel Project film.

References

External links

 
 Aragami (2003) on YouTube

2003 films
2003 action thriller films
Japanese action thriller films
2000s Japanese-language films
Supernatural thriller films
Jidaigeki films
Samurai films
Films directed by Ryuhei Kitamura
Cultural depictions of Miyamoto Musashi
2000s Japanese films